Comaloforno is a mountain of the Pyrenees, Lleida, Catalonia, Spain.

This mountain is within the Aigüestortes i Estany de Sant Maurici National Park.

See also
List of Pyrenean three-thousanders

References

External links 
 Ressenya des Cavallers

Mountains of Catalonia
Mountains of the Pyrenees